Trifun Živanović (born on April 17, 1975 in Santa Monica, California) is an American-born Serbian figure skater.

Career
Through 2001, Zivanovic competed for the United States, twice capturing medals at the U.S. Championships. In 2001, he decided to represent Yugoslavia. The country later became known as Serbia and Montenegro.

To qualify for the 2006 Olympics, Zivanovic needed to place in the top 24 at the 2005 World Championships, where he finished 30th, or in the top six at the 2005 Karl Schafer Memorial, where he was 9th. He finally qualified for the Olympics after several skaters withdrew.

In his final season, Zivanovic competed for Serbia.

Zivanovic has the distinction of having competed at the World Figure Skating Championships representing four countries: the United States, Yugoslavia, Serbia and Montenegro, and Serbia. He is also one of the few skaters to have competed at both the Four Continents Championships and the European Championships. He is the first male singles skater to have competed at every senior-level ISU Championships.

Zivanovic works as an ice skating instructor at Pickwick Ice Center in Burbank, California.

Personal life 
In 2001, Zivanovic moved to Belgrade for a year to establish Yugoslav citizenship. His father is Serbian. His mother has muscular dystrophy.

Programs

Competitive highlights

For Yugoslavia, Serbia and Montenegro, Serbia

For the United States

References

External links
 

1975 births
American male single skaters
Serbian male single skaters
Olympic figure skaters of Serbia and Montenegro
Figure skaters at the 2006 Winter Olympics
Living people
Sportspeople from Santa Monica, California
American people of Serbian descent